Eclipse Paho is a MQTT (Message Queuing Telemetry Transport) implementation.

Paho is available on various platforms and programming languages:
 Java
 C#
 Go
 C
 Python
 JavaScript
Rust

Example
A simple example of using Paho could be:
client = new MqttClient("tcp://localhost:1883", "pahomqttExample");
client.connect();
MqttMessage message = new MqttMessage();
message.setPayload("Hello World".getBytes());
client.publish("pahoExample/theTopic", message);
client.disconnect();

References

See also
 Message Queuing Telemetry Transport

Free software
Software using the Eclipse license